Dusty Hughes (born 16 September 1947) is an English playwright, director and television screenwriter. In the early 1970s he was Theatre Editor of Time Out and helped to establish that magazine’s theatre coverage as an alternative voice. He then joined the Bush Theatre as Artistic Director and helped develop it as a venue for new writing and directed new plays by Snoo Wilson, Kurt Vonnegut, Howard Barker, Ron Hutchinson and Ken Campbell.

Early life 

Hughes was born in Boston, Lincolnshire, the son of Harold Hughes a schoolmaster and Peggy (née Holland) a marriage guidance counsellor and youth theatre producer. Hughes was educated at Queen Elizabeth Grammar School, Wakefield and Trinity Hall, Cambridge.

At Cambridge, he was a member of Footlights where he appeared in the revue “Supernatural Gas” (directed by Clive James) as Tsar Nicolas II and a seven foot high HP Sauce bottle. He is thinly disguised in James’s autobiography May Week Was In June as Rusty Gates.

Career

In 1980, his first play Commitments (which preceded the unrelated Roddy Doyle novel and subsequent film of the same name) won him the London Theatre Critics Most Promising Playwright Award. His subsequent plays have been seen at the National Theatre, the Royal Shakespeare Company in Stratford and London, the Royal Court, Hampstead Theatre, the Traverse Theatre, Edinburgh, the Bush, the Donmar and the West End, as well as in Europe and North America.

He has worked extensively in television. He was joint winner of the Writer's Guild Award for Best Drama Series for Between The Lines and created The Brief for ITV as well as adapting Joseph Conrad’s The Secret Agent for BBC1. He has also written for many other series including Silent Witness, Lewis and most recently, the BBC’s swashbuckling series The Musketeers.

Plays 
Grrr: Edinburgh, 1968 
In At The Death: Bush Theatre, London, 1978
Commitments: Bush Theatre, London, 1980
Heaven and Hell: Edinburgh, 1981
Breach Of The Peace: Bush Theatre, London 1982
Moliere; or, The Union Of Hypocrites: Stratford-on-Avon, 1982
Bad Language: Hampstead Theatre, London, 1983
Philistines: Stratford-on-Avon, 1985
Futurists: Cottesloe Theatre, National Theatre, 1986, directed by Richard Eyre; 
Jenkin's Ear: Royal Court Theatre, London. 1987; 
Metropolis: Piccadilly Theatre, London, 1989 (a musical based on Fritz Lang's 1927 silent movie, Metropolis) 
A Slip of the Tongue: Steppenwolf Theatre, Chicago, 1992
Helpless: Donmar Warehouse Theatre, London, 2000, directed by Robin Lefevre.

Television 
Commitments (Play for Today, 1982)
The Secret Agent (1992)
Silent Witness (2003–2004)
The Brief (2004–2005)
Lewis (2008–2011)
The Musketeers (2016)

Bibliography
Futurists and commitments, Faber and Faber, 1986,

References

External links
 
 John Stanley Bull, British and Irish dramatists since World War II.: Second series, Gale Group, 2001

1947 births
Living people
People from Boston, Lincolnshire
20th-century English dramatists and playwrights
20th-century English male writers
21st-century English male writers
21st-century British dramatists and playwrights
British television writers
English television writers
English screenwriters
English male screenwriters
English male dramatists and playwrights
English theatre directors
British male television writers